Rory Hie (born 1 September 1988) is an Indonesian professional golfer who plays on the Asian Tour.

Amateur career
Hie was born in Balikpapan, Indonesia. He first played golf at the age of six, and went on to spend time in the United States, where he was the most sought after junior player in 2006, reaching the #1 ranked junior in the US. He was also inducted into the Lakewood Scholar Athlete Youth Hall of Fame (California), with various accolades in the American Junior Golf Association.

He enjoyed a successful amateur career, including playing for the golf team at the University of Southern California. He earned the First-Team NCAA All-American Honors (becoming the first Indonesian to do so), and won the Dogwood Invitational in 2008. By end of 2008, he was 2008 California Amateur Player of the Year, top 3-ranked college golfer in the US, and reached the #6 ranked amateur in the world.

Professional career
Hie turned professional in 2008 and achieved his first professional win at the Mercedes International Championship in Indonesia, only one month after turning professional. He gained full playing rights on the Asian Tour, the first Indonesian player to do so. 

In 2011, Hie achieved further success, by becoming the first Indonesian born player to win outside of Indonesia, at the Tangshan China PGA Championship. He also collected two runner-up finishes on the OneAsia Tour at the Indonesian PGA Championship and the Indonesia Open. He was also named Indonesia's player of the year for 2011.

In 2013, Hie won the China Tour Championship on the China Tour.

Hie's biggest success to date came in September 2019, at the Classic Golf and Country Club International Championship in India. Hie shot a 21-under par 267 for a wire-to-wire victory and bettered Rashid Khan and Kim Byung-jun by two strokes.

Personal life
Hie's father; Tommy, acts as his personal coach. He has two older sisters.

Amateur wins
2008 Dogwood Invitational

Professional wins (8)

Asian Tour wins (1)

1Co-sanctioned by the Professional Golf Tour of India

China Tour wins (1)
2013 China Tour Championship

ASEAN PGA Tour wins (1)

PGA Tour of Indonesia wins (4)

Other wins (1)
2011 Tangshan China PGA Championship

References

External links
 
 
 
 

Indonesian male golfers
Asian Tour golfers
Indonesian sportspeople of Chinese descent
People from Balikpapan
Sportspeople from East Kalimantan
1988 births
Living people